Ric Eaton (born December 7, 1962) is an American weightlifter. He competed in the men's heavyweight II event at the 1984 Summer Olympics.

References

External links
 

1962 births
Living people
American male weightlifters
Olympic weightlifters of the United States
Weightlifters at the 1984 Summer Olympics
Sportspeople from Tucson, Arizona